Jan Jindřich Marek (Liblín, 1803–Kralovice, 1853), known also by his nom de plume Jan z Hvězdy, was a Czech priest and poet. He provided the text for Smetana's cantata for mixed chorus and orchestra Česká píseň (Czech Song) 1878.

References

1803 births
1853 deaths